The Tiger Cave is a rock-cut Hindu temple complex located in the hamlet of Saluvankuppam near Mahabalipuram in Tamil Nadu, India. It gets its name from the carvings of tiger heads on the mouth of a cave which forms a part of the complex. The Tiger Cave is considered to be one of the Mahabalipuram rock-cut temples constructed by the Pallavas in the 8th century AD. The site is located on the Bay of Bengal coast and is a popular picnic spot and tourist destination. The temple is maintained by the Archaeological Survey of India (ASI). The discovery of an inscription on a rocky outcrop in the Tiger Cave complex in 2005 led to the excavation of a Sangam period Subrahmanya Temple close by.

Architecture

The rock cut shrine has a flight of steps. It has a small portico flanked by two pilasters which are supported by rampant lions. All around the entrance, there are images of lions, leading to the name of Tiger cave. There are two other cells that have elephant heads carved beneath them. Based on the architectural style, the cave is associated with Rajasimha Narasimhavaram II (690–728).

References

External links

Hindu cave temples in India
Hindu temples in Kanchipuram district
8th-century Hindu temples
8th-century establishments in India
Caves of Tamil Nadu